National Highway 11 or NH 11 is a National Highway in India that links Jaisalmer (Rajasthan) and Rewari (Haryana). This 848 km-long highway passes through Myajlar, Pithala, Jaisalmer, Pokaran, Ramdevara, Phalodi, Bap, Diyatra Gajner, Bikaner, Sri Dungargarh, Rajaldesar, Ratangarh, Rolsabsar, Fatehpur, Tajsar, Mandawa, Jhunjhunu, Bagar, Chirawa, Singhana, Pacheri, Narnaul, Ateli and Rewari.

Most of 760 km length of National Highway 11 is starting or junction point near National Highway 70 (Munabao -Tanot Highway) Mayajlar District Jaisalmer in the state of Rajasthan and the remaining length and starting point or junction with National Highway 352 (Narwana-Jhajjar-Rewari) in Rewari district in the state of Haryana. It is the shortest route between Delhi and Bikaner and reduces travelling time between Delhi and Bikaner.

Junctions 

 Terminal Near Rewari

 Near Narnaul

 Near Narnaul

 Near Singhana (Jhunjhunu)
 
 Near Fatehpur Shekhwati (Sikar)
 
 Near Fatehpur Shekhwati (Sikar)

 Near Bikaner
 
 Near Bap (Bikaner)

 Near Pokhran

 Near Jaisalmer District

 Terminal Near Myajlar

Route

Rewari, Pali, Kund Kathuwas, Ateli, Bachhod, Narnaul, Raghunathpura, Goad Balawa, Pacheri, Dumoli Khurd, Singhana, Bhaisawata Kalan, Adooka, Chirawa, Ojtu, Bkhatawarpura, Bagar, Jhunjhunu, Nayasar, Abusar, Durana, Hetamsar, Wahidpura, Tetra, Mandawa, Sadinsar, Balod Bari, Tajsar, Daultabad, Fatehpur, Shekhawati, Hardyalpura, Kalyanpura, Rolsabsar, Biramsar, Ratangarh, Rajaldesar, Kitasar, Shri Dungargarh, Jodhasar, Seruna, Gusainsar, Norangdesar, Raisar, Kanasar, Bikaner, Gajner, Madh, Diyatra Nokhra, Kanji ki sid, Gadna, Bap, Hindal Gol, Jor, Malhar, Phalodi, Ramdevara, Gomat, Pokhran, Khetolai, Lathi, Chandan, Sagra, Thaiyat, Jaisalmer War Museum, Jaisalmer, Pithala, Ghotru Rai Temple, Dhobha, Phuliya, Myajlar.

Rewari bypass
To create connectivity between NH 11 and NH 48 (Delhi-Jaipur national highway), a new stretch of NH 11 is being constructed bypassing Rewari city. The existing junction of NH 352 (Rohtak-Jhajjar-Rewari national highway) with NH 48 (Delhi-Jaipur national highway) will be the terminus or starting point of NH 11. The new alignment of NH 11 between NH 48 and Narnaul will bypass south of Rewari city and meet the existing Rewari-Narnaul road near Khori railway station. Thus vehicles going to or from Narnaul will not have to enter Rewari city.

National Highway 11 (Old Number)
Earlier, the old route of NH 11 started from Rajasthan-Uttar Pradesh border and went through Bharatpur, Mahwa, Dausa, Jaipur and Ringas to Sikar and then further to Fatehpur, Ratangarh, Dungargarh and terminated at Bikaner on old NH 15. It was 531 km long. It connected popular tourist destinations Jaipur and Agra via the UNESCO World Heritage Site of Keoladeo National Park in Bharatpur.

The new route starts from NH 48 (Delhi-Jaipur national highway) in Rewari district and goes through Narnaul, Chirawa and Jhunjhunu to meet the old NH 11 at Fatehpur. From Bikaner it continues to Jaisalmer.

Road Construction
NH 11 is being upgraded from Fatehpur to Rewari.

This road also good news for Mandawa It is part of NH 11. This is Junction point on National Highway 352(Narwana-Jind-Rohtak-Rewari-Bawal) in Rewari in state of Haryana and other Junction point on NH 70(Munabao-Myajlar-Tanot) Myajlar in District Jaisalmer in the state of Rajasthan. The First Phase upgraded between Fatehpur to Jhunjhunu via Mandawa (0.00 to 49.00k.m.) by Tomar Construction Company New Delhi in the supervision of NHAI Office Churu. This NH 11 provides better connectivity between major cities Delhi, Rewari, Ateli, Narnaul, Singhana, Chirawa, Bagar, Jhunjhunu, Mandawa, Fatehpur, Rolsabsar Ratangarh, Rajaldesar, Dungargarh, Bikaner, Phalodi, Ramdevara, Pokharan, Jaisalmer, Myajlar. It also promotes Trade Tourism Commercials activity and also provide opportunities of employment in the state of Haryana and Rajasthan.

Photo gallery

See also
 List of National Highways in India (by Highway Number)
 National Highways Development Project

References

External links

 Map of NH 11

National highways in India
National Highways in Haryana
National Highways in Rajasthan